Cameraria torridella is a moth of the family Gracillariidae. It is found in the Rift Valley in Kenya.

The forewings are elongate and the ground colour is shiny ochreous with white markings consisting of a basal streak, two fascia, two costal and one dorsal strigulae. The hindwings are light fuscous with a long light ochreous shiny fringe. Adults are on wing in early March and from late October to early December.

The larvae feed as leaf miners on Dombeya torrida. The mine is tentiform and made on the underside of the leaf.

Etymology
The name is derived from the specific name of the host plant, coupled with the diminutive Latin suffix –ella.

References

Moths described in 2012
torridella
Endemic moths of Kenya
Moths of Africa

Leaf miners
Taxa named by Jurate de Prins